Tilapia busumana is a species of cichlid native to Lake Bosumtwi, the Bia River Basin, the Pra River Basin and the Tano River Basin in Ghana and Côte d'Ivoire.  This species can reach a length of  SL.  It can also be found in the aquarium trade.  In 2013, research published by Dunz & Schliewen indicated that this species does not belong in the genus Tilapia, but is rather closer to "Steatocranus" irvinei (itself not related to the remaining Steatocranus) and Gobiocichla.  It is currently retained in Tilapia pending further research.

References

External links

busumana
Taxa named by Albert Günther
Fish described in 1903